Friends 4 Ever may refer to:

Film and TV
Friends 4 Ever, 2011  Halloween short film written and directed by Shane Dawson
Amigos x siempre (English title: Friends 4 Ever) Mexican children's telenovela produced by Rosy Ocampo for Televisa in 2000
Amigos X Siempre (soundtrack) for the Mexican television series ¡Amigos X Siempre! ("Friends 4 Ever")

Music
Friends 4 Ever, album by Michael W. Smith 2001 Dove Youth/Children's Musical Album of the Year - Friends Are Friends Forever
 "Friends 4 Ever" (beFour album), 2009
 "Friends 4 Ever" (Pip Skid album), Canadian rapper 2001
"Friends-4-Ever", song by American sampler Girl Talk from his album Secret Diary
"Friends 4 ever", Malayalam song from the album Malayalee by band Team Malayalee Music of Kerala 2008
"Friends 4 Ever", song (Jan Lindvaag, Aleena Gibson) Follow Your Heart (Nikki Webster album)

See also
Friends Forever (disambiguation)